Helge Flatby (8 December 1894 – 18 July 1971) was a Norwegian cyclist. He competed in two events at the 1920 Summer Olympics. 

Helge was 25 when he competed in the 1920 summer Olympics which was held at Antwerpian, he competed as a cyclist. He had trained hard and got ranked 28th in the men's individual road race and he ranked 8th in the men's team road race.

References

External links
 

1894 births
1971 deaths
Norwegian male cyclists
Olympic cyclists of Norway
Cyclists at the 1920 Summer Olympics
Cyclists from Oslo